Howdy! is a studio album by Pat Boone, released in 1956. It followed a self-titled compilation album of previously released singles, making Howdy! Boone's studio album debut.

Billboard listed Howdy! as the 19th best selling pop album of 1956, and as the 17th most played by radio.

Critical reception
AllMusic wrote: "Boone's musical instincts are keenly evident to the senses: never too much when exercising his strong young voice on 'Lucky Old Sun', never too little with the sweet subtlety of 'Would You Like to Take a Walk?'."

Track listing
A1 "Begin the Beguine" (Cole Porter)
A2 "Hummin' the Blues" (Beasley Smith, Billy Vaughn)
A3 "Would You Like to Take a Walk?" (Billy Rose, Harry Warren, Mort Dixon)
A4 "All I Do Is Dream Of You" (Arthur Freed, Nacio Herb Brown)
A5 "That Lucky Old Sun" (Beasley Smith, Haven Gillespie)
A6 "Beg Your Pardon" (Beasley Smith, Francis Craig)
B1 "Chattanooga Shoe Shine Boy" (Harry Stone, Jack Stapp)
B2 "With You" (Irving Berlin)
B3 "Every Little Thing" (Beasley Smith)
B4 "Forgive Me" (Jack Yellen, Milton Ager)
B5 "Sunday" (Chester Conn, Benny Krueger, Jule Styne, Ned Miller) 
B6 "Harbor Lights" (Jimmy Kennedy, P.K. DeGooreynd)

References

1957 albums
Pat Boone albums
Dot Records albums
Albums produced by Randy Wood (record producer)